Mie Augustesen (born 19 July 1988, in Vejle) is a Danish handball player. She currently plays for the club Herning-Ikast Håndbold, and previously the Danish national team.

She competed at the 2010 European Women's Handball Championship, where the Danish team placed fourth, and Augustesen was voted into the All-Star Team.

References

External links
 Profile on Randers HK official website

1988 births
Living people
Danish female handball players
FCM Håndbold players
People from Vejle Municipality
Sportspeople from the Region of Southern Denmark